Reginald White may refer to:

 Reg White (1935–2010), English boat builder and sailor
 Reginald White (British Army officer), Commander of the Ceylon Defence Force

See also
 Reggie White (disambiguation)